Xystrocera is a genus of beetles in the subfamily Cerambycinae and the tribe Xystrocerini, with a relatively world-wide distribution.

Species
Xystrocera includes the following according to GBIF:

 Xystrocera abrupta Aurivillius, 1908
 Xystrocera alcyonea Pascoe, 1866
 Xystrocera ansorgei Gahan, 1898
 Xystrocera antennata Adlbauer, 2011
 Xystrocera apiculata Pascoe, 1869
 Xystrocera asperata Thomson, 1858
 Xystrocera australasiae Hope, 1842
 Xystrocera bomfordi Veiga-Ferreira, 1971
 Xystrocera boulardi Breuning & Teocchi, 1972
 Xystrocera brunnea Aurivillius, 1924
 Xystrocera buquetii Thomson, 1858
 Xystrocera carinipennis Breuning, 1957
 Xystrocera chalybeata Gahan, 1890
 Xystrocera conradti Breuning, 1957
 Xystrocera curvipes Breuning, 1957
 Xystrocera cyanella Chevrolat, 1855
 Xystrocera cyanipennis Breuning, 1957
 Xystrocera danilevskyi Vives, 2013
 Xystrocera devittata Kolbe, 1893
 Xystrocera dispar Fåhraeus, 1872
 Xystrocera dundensis Lepesme, 1953
 Xystrocera elongata Breuning, 1957
 Xystrocera erosa Pascoe, 1864
 Xystrocera femorata Chevrolat, 1855
 Xystrocera ferreirae Martins, 1980
 Xystrocera festiva Thomson, 1861
 Xystrocera flavovariegata Breuning, 1957
 Xystrocera frontalis Thomson, 1858
 Xystrocera fuscomaculata Breuning, 1957
 Xystrocera globosa (Olivier, 1795)
 Xystrocera gracilipes Breuning, 1957
 Xystrocera granulipennis Breuning, 1957
 Xystrocera granulithorax Breuning, 1964
 Xystrocera holatripes Breuning, 1957
 Xystrocera interrupta Jordan, 1903
 Xystrocera laeta Péringuey, 1892
 Xystrocera lujae Hintz, 1911
 Xystrocera marginipennis Murray, 1870
 Xystrocera matilei Breuning & Teocchi, 1972
 Xystrocera minuscula Breuning, 1957
 Xystrocera minuta Jordan, 1894
 Xystrocera natalensis Corinta-Ferreira, 1954
 Xystrocera nigrita Audinet-Serville, 1834
 Xystrocera nitidicollis Quedenfeldt, 1883
 Xystrocera orientalis Breuning, 1961
 Xystrocera pauliani Lepesme & Breuning, 1951
 Xystrocera pseudosimilis Breuning, 1957
 Xystrocera reducta Duffy, 1954
 Xystrocera rhodesiana Veiga-Ferreira, 1954
 Xystrocera ruficornis Corinta-Ferreira, 1954
 Xystrocera rufobrunnea Breuning, 1957
 Xystrocera semperi Breuning, 1957
 Xystrocera similis Jordan, 1894
 Xystrocera skeletoides Breuning, 1957
 Xystrocera sudanica Breuning, 1957
 Xystrocera teocchii Adlbauer, 2011
 Xystrocera ugandensis Martins, 1980
 Xystrocera unicolor Martins, 1980
 Xystrocera velutina Jordan, 1894
 Xystrocera vicina Corinta-Ferreira, 1954
 Xystrocera violascens Franz, 1942
 Xystrocera virescens Newman, 1840
 Xystrocera viridilucens Breuning, 1957
 Xystrocera vittata (Fabricius, 1793)

References

Cerambycinae
Xystrocerini